Frank Ellis  (22 August 1905 – 3 February 2006)  was a world leader in the treatment of cancer by radiation therapy. He was born in Sheffield, England and was educated at King Edward VII School and the University of Sheffield. He subsequently worked as a radiation oncologist at Weston Park Hospital, Sheffield. In 1943 he became the first director of the Radiotherapy Department at the Royal London Hospital. In 1950 he established the Radiotherapy Department at the Churchill Hospital, Oxford. After retiring in 1970, he held visiting professorial appointments at the University of Southern California, in Wisconsin and at the Memorial Sloane-Kettering Institute in New York.

Ellis was President of the British Institute of Radiology.  He was awarded the Gold Medal of the Royal College of Radiologists in 1987.  He was made an Officer of the Order of the British Empire for his contributions to cancer services over much of the 20th century.  Ellis was also a Fellow of the Royal College of Physicians, the Royal College of Radiologists and the American College of Radiology.  The Frank Ellis Medal of the Royal College of Radiologists is awarded in his honour and a lecture is held in his name.

He was active until very close to his death at the age of 100, receiving in person a Sheffield University honorary doctorate at the age of 100, attending the centenary celebrations at the University of Sheffield in 2005 and the Old Edwardians dinner in 2005. There was a memorial service for him at Wolfson College, Oxford, on 17 June 2006.

References

External links
Various Google references

1905 births
2006 deaths
People educated at King Edward VII School, Sheffield
Alumni of the University of Sheffield
English centenarians
Men centenarians
Officers of the Order of the British Empire
Fellows of the Royal College of Physicians
Fellows of the Royal College of Radiologists